Nancy Brilli (born 10 April 1964 as Nicoletta Brilli) is an Italian film, television and stage actress.

Career 
Born in Rome, of partial Ukrainian origin, Nancy Brilli was introduced in cinema by Pasquale Squitieri, making her debut in a role of note in Claretta (1984). In 1990 she won a David di Donatello for Best Supporting Actress and a Silver Ribbon in the same category for the role of Sophie in Little Misunderstandings.

Personal life 
Nancy Brilli was married for two years to actor Massimo Ghini and later, again for two years, to director Luca Manfredi, son of actor and director Nino Manfredi. Previously she had a relationship with the songwriter Ivano Fossati. 

In 1994 she discovered she suffered from endometriosis and underwent the removal of an ovarian cancer. 

She is a niece of the racing driver Gastone Brilli-Peri.

She is a Roman Catholic.

Filmography

References

External links 

 

Italian film actresses
1964 births
Actresses from Rome
Italian people of Ukrainian descent
Italian television actresses
Italian stage actresses
Living people
Italian Roman Catholics
David di Donatello winners
Nastro d'Argento winners
20th-century Italian actresses